Louis Raphael "Bull" Durham (born Louis Raphael Staub; June 27, 1877 – June 28, 1960) was a pitcher in Major League Baseball. He pitched in 2 games for the Brooklyn Superbas in 1904, 2 games for the Washington Senators in 1907 and five games for the New York Giants during 1908 and 1909.

Durham was born in New Oxford, Pennsylvania and grew up in Pennsylvania. After he began playing minor league baseball he got into trouble with the league due to a fight in a bar. He was banned, but found a loophole by changing his name to "Bull Durham", after the Bull Durham Smoking Tobacco brand. Once he finished his baseball career in 1909, he began acting and had roles in several silent films. He died in Bentley, Kansas.

References

1877 births
1960 deaths
Baseball players from Pennsylvania
Major League Baseball pitchers
Brooklyn Superbas players
Washington Senators (1901–1960) players
New York Giants (NL) players
Augusta Tourists players
Louisville Colonels (minor league) players
Indianapolis Indians players
Denver Grizzlies (baseball) players